The 1958 Campeonato Profesional was the 11th season of Colombia's top-flight football league. After the previous season's multi-stage competition, the Campeonato Profesional returned to a single-stage format, with everyone playing each other 4 times over the season. The tournament began in May, a month after the end of the previous season.

Independiente Santa Fe won the league for 2nd time in its history after getting 48 points (Santa Fe was the champion of the first Campeonato Profesional in 1948), while defending champions Independiente Medellín did not compete.

Background
10 teams competed in the tournament, down from the previous season's 12, with Unión Magdalena withdrawing because economic problems, while Boca Juniors de Cali refusing to participate in any further Dimayor tournaments. To balance their removal, Atlético Manizales rejoined the competition (its last tournament being 1954). Atlético Nacional and Independiente Medellín mixed their teams competing under the name of Atlético Nacional, but known popularly as Independiente Nacional.

League system
Every team played four games against each other team, two at home and two away. Teams received two points for a win and one point for a draw. If two or more teams were tied on points, places were determined by goal difference. The team with the most points is the champion of the league.

Teams

Final league table

Results

First turn

Second turn

Top goalscorers

Source: RSSSF.com Colombia 1958

References

External links
Dimayor Official Page

Prim
Colombia
Categoría Primera A seasons